Palme is a Portuguese freguesia ("civil parish"), located in the municipality of Barcelos. The population in 2011 was 1,073, in an area of 8.31 km².

References

Freguesias of Barcelos, Portugal